Gösta Gabriel Sjöberg (6 March 1896 – 26 November 1968) was a Swedish diver who competed in the 1912 Summer Olympics. He finished fourth in his heat of the 10 m platform event and did not advance to the final.

References

1896 births
1968 deaths
Swedish male divers
Olympic divers of Sweden
Divers at the 1912 Summer Olympics
20th-century Swedish people